Ollie O'Connor (born 2 April 1959) was an Irish hurler who played for Limerick Senior Championship club Ballybrown. He played for the Limerick senior hurling team for a number of years, during which time he usually lined out as a right corner-forward.

Honours

Ballybrown
Munster Senior Club Hurling Championship (1): 1989
Limerick Senior Hurling Championship (2): 1989, 1991

Limerick
Munster Senior Hurling Championship (2): 1980, 1981

Munster
Railway Cup (3): 1981, 1984, 1985

References

1959 births
Living people
Ballybrown hurlers
Limerick inter-county hurlers
Munster inter-provincial hurlers